Orlovka is a rural locality (a station) in Orlovskoye Rural Settlement, Gorodishchensky District, Volgograd Oblast, Russia. The population was 102 as of 2010. There are 3 streets.

Geography 
Orlovka is located in steppe, 13 km northeast from Gorodishche (the district's administrative centre) by road. Orlovka is the nearest rural locality.

References 

Rural localities in Gorodishchensky District, Volgograd Oblast